Ryanodine receptor 1 (RYR-1) also known as skeletal muscle calcium release channel or skeletal muscle-type ryanodine receptor is one of a class of ryanodine receptors and a protein found primarily in skeletal muscle. In humans, it is encoded by the RYR1 gene.

Function 

RYR1 functions as a calcium release channel in the sarcoplasmic reticulum, as well as a connection between the sarcoplasmic reticulum and the transverse tubule. RYR1 is associated with the dihydropyridine receptor (L-type calcium channels) within the sarcolemma of the T-tubule, which opens in response to depolarization, and thus effectively means that the RYR1 channel opens in response to depolarization of the cell.

RYR1 plays a signaling role during embryonic skeletal myogenesis. A correlation exists between RYR1-mediated Ca2+ signaling and the expression of multiple molecules involved in key myogenic signaling pathways. Of these, more than 10 differentially expressed genes belong to the Wnt family which are essential for differentiation. This coincides with the observation that without RYR1 present, muscle cells appear in smaller groups, are underdeveloped, and lack organization. Fiber type composition is also affected, with less type 1 muscle fibers when there are decreased amounts of RYR1. These findings demonstrate RYR1 has a non-contractile role during muscle development.

RYR1 is mechanically linked to neuromuscular junctions for the calcium release-calcium induced biological process. While nerve-derived signals are required for acetylcholine receptor cluster distribution, there is evidence to suggest RYR1 activity is an important mediator in the formation and patterning of these receptors during embryological development. The signals from the nerve and RYR1 activity appear to counterbalance each other. When RYR1 is eliminated, the acetylcholine receptor clusters appear in an abnormally narrow pattern, yet without signals from the nerve, the clusters are scattered and broad. Although their direct role is still unknown, RYR1 is required for proper distribution of acetylcholine receptor clusters.

Clinical significance 

Mutations in the RYR1 gene are associated with malignant hyperthermia susceptibility, central core disease, minicore myopathy with external ophthalmoplegia and samaritan myopathy, a benign congenital myopathy. Alternatively spliced transcripts encoding different isoforms have been demonstrated. Dantrolene may be the only known drug that is effective during cases of malignant hyperthermia.

Interactions 

RYR1 has been shown to interact with:
 calmodulin
 FKBP1A
 HOMER1
 HOMER2
 HOMER3 and
 TRDN.

See also 
 Ryanodine receptor

References

Further reading

External links 
 
  GeneReviews/NIH/UW entry on Multiminicore Disease
  GeneReviews/NCBI/NIH/UW entry on Malignant Hyperthermia Susceptibility
 RYR1 Variation Database 

Ion channels